Qari Ghulam Rasool (1935 – 2014) was a Pakistani Qari and an Islamic scholar.

Biography 
He was born in 1935 in Salamatpura, Lahore. He received education from famous seminary Darul Uloom Hizbul Ahnaf. He learned Qirat from Qari Abdul Malik and later on became famous across the globe due to unique qualities. He was awarded numerous awards besides a presidential award. He had recited the Quran at PTV and Radio Pakistan for more than 50 years.

He also taught at Jamia Nizamia and later on established his own five madaris. He was a close friend of Shah Ahmad Noorani and Abdul Sattar Khan Niazi.

Death 
He died on 9 March 2014 in Lahore.

References

20th-century Muslim theologians
Pakistani religious leaders
1935 births
2014 deaths